Boves is a comune (municipality) in the Province of Cuneo in the Italian region Piedmont, located about  south of Turin and about  south of Cuneo.   It borders the following municipalities: Borgo San Dalmazzo, Cuneo, Limone Piemonte, Peveragno, Robilante, Roccavione, and Vernante.

The town of Boves was the scene, on 19 September 1943, of a massacre of civilians by the 1st SS Panzer Division, in which the German troops set fire to more than 350 houses and killed numerous villagers.

Twin towns
 Castello di Godego, Italy
 Mauguio, France

References

External links 
  

Cities and towns in Piedmont